The Profession of Arms is a 1983 Canadian documentary film directed by Michael Bryans and Tina Viljoen. It was nominated for an Academy Award for Best Documentary Feature.

The film was the third film in the seven-part War series, hosted by Gwynne Dyer, examining modern warfare.

References

External links

The Profession of Arms at the National Film Board of Canada

1983 films
1983 documentary films
English-language Canadian films
Canadian documentary films
National Film Board of Canada documentaries
Documentary films about war
Works by Gwynne Dyer
1980s English-language films
1980s Canadian films